Black Fork is an unincorporated community in Scott County, in the U.S. state of Arkansas.

History
The community takes its name from nearby Black Fork creek. A variant name is "Blackfork". A post office called Black Fork was established in 1877, and remained in operation until 1981.

References

Unincorporated communities in Arkansas
Unincorporated communities in Scott County, Arkansas